A Guide for Beginners: The Voice of Silver (Posobie dlya nachinayuschih: Glas Sérebra) was one of two CD compilations released to mark Coil's first performance in Russia. It is a collection of their ambient music style works. The titles were devised by the Russian musician and Coil collaborator Ivan Pavlov.

Release history
The album was released an edition of 1,000 copies.
This compilation, as well as its twin Пособие для кончающих: Волос Злата, were later released as the double CD The Golden Hare With A Voice Of Silver.
The catalogue number for this release is FL 3182-2.

Song origins
 "Amethyst Deceivers" was originally released on the single Autumn Equinox: Amethyst Deceivers.
 "The Lost Rivers Of London" was previously released on Unnatural History III as "Lost Rivers Of London". The song was originally released on the compilation Succour - Terrascope Benefit Album. In 1996, the song was remade and released as "London's Lost Rivers" on the Black Light District album A Thousand Lights In A Darkened Room.
 "Are You Shivering?" was originally released on Musick To Play In The Dark Vol. 1.
 "Ostia (The Death Of Pasolini)" was originally released on Horse Rotorvator.
 "Where Are You?" was originally released on Musick To Play In The Dark Vol. 2.
 "At The Heart Of It All" was originally released on Scatology.
 This version of "A Cold Cell" is exclusive to this compilation. A similar version was released on the compilation The Wire Tapper 6 with a track timing of 6:24. The song was later reworked and released as "Cold Cell" on The Ape Of Naples.
 "Batwings (A Limnal Hymn)" is also an exclusive version, although a very similar version appears on Musick To Play In The Dark Vol. 2. The difference between the two is that the MTPID2 version is 11:32 long with music, while the shorter version that appears on this compilation, has an opening of a sound resembling a truck driving on a road.
 "Who'll Fall?" was originally released on Stolen & Contaminated Songs.
 "The Dreamer Is Still Asleep" originally appeared on Musick To Play In The Dark Vol. 1.

Track listing
 "Amethyst Deceivers" – 6:33
 "Lost Rivers of London" – 7:41
 "Are You Shivering?" – 9:38
 "Ostia (The Death of Pasolini)" – 6:21
 Where Are You?" – 7:51
 "At the Heart of It All" – 5:12
 "A Cold Cell" – 5:58
 "Batwings (A Limnal Hymn)" – 11:09
 "Who'll Fall?" – 5:15
 "The Dreamer Is Still Asleep" – 9:41

References

External links
 
 
 A Guide for Beginners: A Silver Voice at Brainwashed

2001 compilation albums
Coil (band) compilation albums